The 2004 Hall of Fame Tennis Championships (also known as 2004 Miller Lite Hall of Fame Championships for sponsorship reasons) was a tennis tournament played on grass courts at the International Tennis Hall of Fame in Newport, Rhode Island in the United States and was part of the ATP International Series of the 2004 ATP Tour. It was the 28th edition of the tournament and was held from July 5 through July 11, 2004.

Finals

Singles

 Greg Rusedski defeated  Alexander Popp 7–6(7–2), 7–6(7–2) 
 It was Rusedski's only singles title of the year and the 14th of his career.

Doubles
 Jordan Kerr /  Jim Thomas defeated  Gregory Carraz /  Nicolas Mahut 6–3, 6–7(5–7), 6–3

References

External links
 
 ATP tournament profile
 ITF tournament edition details

 
Miller Lite Hall of Fame Championships
Hall of Fame Open
Hall of Fame Tennus
Tennis tournaments in Rhode Island
Hall of Fame Tennis Championships
Hall of Fame Tennis Championships